Paul Henry Kyara was a Tanzanian politician and chairman of the Sauti ya Umma (SAU - people's voice) party.

kyara was nominated as sau presidential candidate in Tanzania general election, 14 December 2005, Kyara finished  receiving 16, 380 votes.

References

Living people
Year of birth missing (living people)
Sauti ya Umma politicians